Hal's Bells is an album by American avant-garde jazz composer, bandleader, and multi-instrumentalist Hal Russell recorded in 1992 and released on the ECM label in 1992.

Reception
The Allmusic review awarded the album 4½ stars stating "Although Russell died soon after recording this, there's no sense of desperation on this record; instead there is pure joy, the silly seriousness that Russell brought to all of his recordings".

Track listing
All compositions by Hal Russell except as indicated
 "Buddhi" - 4:13  
 "Millard Mottker" - 6:48  
 "Portrait of Benny" - 4:01  
 "Strangest Kiss" - 5:03  
 "Susanna" - 4:47  
 "Carolina Moon" (John Pennington) - 6:31  
 "Kenny G." - 6:21  
 "I Need You Now" - 4:38  
 "For Free" - 6:33  
 "Moon of Manakoora" (Alfred Newman, Frank Loesser) - 4:03

Personnel
Hal Russell - tenor saxophone, soprano saxophone, trumpet, musette, vibraphone, drums, bass marimba, congas, gongs, bells, percussion, voice

References

ECM Records albums
Hal Russell albums
1992 albums